Lubanglong is a Rongmei village located in the Khoupum Valley of Noney district, Manipur, India.  It consists of 145-200 households.

Gallery

References

Villages in Tamenglong district